When, on 1 January 1923, the Great North of Scotland Railway (GNoSR) merged with other railways to become the London and North Eastern Railway, it owned  of line. Its main line, from Aberdeen in Scotland to Elgin via Keith, served branches to Fraserburgh and Peterhead, Alford, Oldmeldrum, Macduff, Banff, Boat of Garten and Lossiemouth. The GNoSR operated two routes to Elgin, one via Moray Firth, known as the Coast line, and another via Keith and Craigelliache; these connected with the Highland Railway at Keith and Elgin for services to Inverness. Another line, used by the reigning monarch when they travelled to Balmoral Castle, connected Aberdeen with Ballater.

Main line
The first section of Great North of Scotland's main line opened in 1854 from Kittybrewster to Huntly and was extended two years later to Keith. A through route to Inverness was formed in 1858 when was to become the Highland Railway reached the station and a junction was formed. Services ran to a terminus in Aberdeen at Waterloo from 1856 before Aberdeen joint station opened in 1867. The line was extended at the country end to Dufftown in 1862. Meanwhile, the Morayshire Railway had built a line from Rothes to Craigellachie, and subsequently linked this line to its Elgin station in 1862. This was connected to the GNoSR when the Strathspey Railway opened in 1863.

The GNoSR ran suburban services between Aberdeen and Dyce from 1887 and 1937.

Buchan section
The line was worked by the GNoSR from opening, who absorbed the original railway company on 1 August 1866. The line was closed to passengers on 4 October 1965 and completely 8 October 1979.

Cruden section
The GNoSR opened a branch from Ellon to Boddam on 2 August 1897 to serve a hotel and golf complex it was building at Cruden Bay. The line closed to passengers on 31 October 1932 and completely on 7 November 1945.

Peterhead branch
The railway was worked by the GNoSR from opening, who absorbed the Formartine and Buchan on 1 August 1866. The branch closed to passengers on 3 May 1965 and completely in 1970.

St Combs Light Railway
The GNoSR opened the St Combs Light Railway from Fraserburgh to St Combs on 1 July 1903, and it closed on 3 May 1965.

Alford branch
The Alford Valley Railway from Kintore to Alford opened on 21 March 1859, worked by the GNoSR, with whom it merged on 1 August 1866. The line closed to passengers on 2 January 1950 and to goods in 1966.

Oldmeldrum branch
The Inverury and Old Meldrum Junction Railway from Inverurie to Old Meldrum opened on 26 June 1856, worked by the GNoSR, with whom it merged on 1 August 1866. The line closed to passengers on 2 November 1931 and to goods on 3 January 1966.

Macduff branch
Authorised in 1855 and sponsored by the Great North, the Banff, Macduff and Turriff Junction Railway opened a line from Inveramsay to Turriff in 1857, and another company, the Banff, Macduff and Turriff Extension built and opened an extension to Banff & Macduff nearly two years later. The railways were worked by the GNoSR from opening, and merged with it on 1 August 1866. The short extension to Macduff was opened by the GNoSR in 1872, the original terminal closed and demolished. The branch closed to passengers on 1 October 1951, the section north of Turriff completely on 1 August 1961 and completely on 3 January 1966.

Coast line
The railway from Grange to Portsoy via Tillynaught was opened by the Banff, Portsoy and Strathisla Railway on 30 July 1859, with full services from 2 August following a derailment on the opening day.  The GNoSR operated services from 1863; these ran from Grange to Banff with a connection at Tillynaught. This became an alternate route from Aberdeen to Elgin when the coast line had fully opened in 1886, a new curve allowing direct access from Aberdeen. Cairnie Platform (later Cairnie Junction) was built to allow trains to divide, with portions for Elgin via Craigellachie and the Coast Line. Direct access to Grange from the line was withdrawn after the curve closed on 7 March 1960 and the line closed completely on 6 May 1968.

Banff branch
This was served from Grange until the Coast line opened in 1886, when services connected at Tillynaught.  The branch closed to passengers on 6 July 1964 and completely on 6 May 1968.

Speyside section
The Strathspey Railway opened on 1 July 1863 between Dufftown and Abernethy (later called Nethy Bridge), via Strathspey Junction (later called Craigellachie) where it joined an extension of the Morayshire Railway. The line from Dufftown north through Craigellachie became the main line, and the railway south to Nethy Bridge, (later extended to Boat of Garten) the branch line. The Strathspey was absorbed by the Great North of Scotland Railway in 1866. The line closed to passengers on 18 October 1965, the section south of Aberlour completely on 4 November 1968 and the remaining section completely 15 November 1971.

Lossiemouth branch
The Lossiemouth branch was built by the Morayshire Railway from its Elgin station on 10 August 1852. Worked by the GNoSR since 1863, the Morayshire Railway was absorbed by the GNoSR in August 1881. The line was closed to passengers on 6 April 1964 and completely two years later.

Deeside section
The Deeside Railway opened from Ferryhill to Banchory on 8 September 1853 and services were extended to Guild Street when this opened the following year. A new company, the Aboyne Extension opened the line to Aboyne in 1859, and the Aboyne & Braemar Railway extended the line to Ballater in 1866. The Aberdeen joint station became the terminus when this opened in 1867. The Deeside Railway was leased by the GNoSR from 1866 who absorbed the Deeside Railway on 1 August 1875 and the Aboyne & Braemar Railway on 31 January 1876. The line closed to passengers on 28 February 1966, the section west of Culter completely on 18 July 1966 and the remaining section completely 2 January 1967.

Notes and references

Notes

References

Books

External links

History of the GNSR Great North of Scotland Railway Association
Great North of Scotland Railway RAILSCOT

Great North of Scotland Railway